The Reluctant Heroes is a made-for-TV movie and war film set in the period of the Korean War. It was directed by Robert Day and starred Ken Berry, Jim Hutton, Trini López, Don Marshall, Ralph Meeker, Cameron Mitchell and Warren Oates.

Plot 

A tired platoon is about to be sent home, but is picked to hold an observation point. They are led by the inexperienced Lt. Parnell Murphy (Ken Berry), who is a military historian with no combat experience. In order to defend Hill 656, which has strategic importance, he uses military tactics of Napoleon and Alexander the Great, which he draws from his own studies in history.

Cast 

 Lt. Parnell Murphy ... Ken Berry
 Cpl. Bill Lukens ... Jim Hutton
 Pvt. Sam Rivera ... Trini López
 Pvt. Carver LeMoyne ... Don Marshall
 Capt. Luke Danvers ... Ralph Meeker
 Sgt. Marion Bryce ... Cameron Mitchell
 Cpl. Leroy Sprague ... Warren Oates
 Pvt. Golden ... Richard Young
 Cpl. Bates ... Michael St. George
 Korean Officer ... Soon-Tek Oh

Production 
The original title of the film was The Egghead on Hill 656 and was based on an original script by Herman Hoffman. Robert Mirsch signed to produce in February 1971.

It was filmed on a Paramount Studios back lot.

One of the issues addressed in the film is racism. Even though the film was lacking in some areas, its emphasis was correct on the strategic importance of bridges.

Release 
The Los Angeles Times said "there is nothing new in the movie" but it "has its entertaining moments mostly because the players on the screen are so easy to watch."

References

Bibliography

External links 
 
The Reluctant Heroes at Letterbox DVD
Reluctant Heroes at TCMDB

1971 films
1971 war films
1971 television films
ABC Movie of the Week
Korean War films
Films set in Korea
Films set in the 1950s
Films directed by Robert Day
Films produced by Aaron Spelling
1970s English-language films